Manivannan s/o Gowindasamy is a Malaysian politician. He was the Member of Parliament for Kapar from 2013 to 2018. He is a member of the People's Justice Party (PKR), a component party in the Pakatan Harapan (PH) opposition coalition then.

On 28 Nov 2017 Manivannan resigned as PKR's secretary whip after his error on the omission of an opposition vote during a tabulation of bloc vote on Budget 2018 he called in the parliament earlier.

In the 2018 election, Manivannan contested as PKR candidate in the Perak State Legislative Assembly constituency of Hutan Melintang instead but lost to the Barisan Nasional (BN) candidate in a three corner fight with Pan-Malaysian Islamic Party (PAS) candidate.

Election results

See also 

Kapar (federal constituency)
Hutan Melintang (state constituency)

References

Living people
Year of birth missing (living people)
People from Selangor
Malaysian politicians of Indian descent
Malaysian politicians of Tamil descent
People's Justice Party (Malaysia) politicians
Members of the Dewan Rakyat
21st-century Malaysian politicians